Kaitangata can mean the following:
Kaitangata, New Zealand, a small town near the coast of South Otago in New Zealand
Kaitangata Mine disaster, a coal mining disaster at Kaitangata in 1879
Kaitangata Line, a branch line from Stirling on the Main South Line to Kaitangata
Kaitangata (mythology), a character in Māori mythology